Hatch is a village in Doña Ana County, New Mexico, United States. The population was 1,648 at the 2010 census. The town is experiencing moderate growth, along with its outliers of Salem, Arrey, Derry, and Rincon. Hatch is widely known as the "Chile Capital of the World," for growing a wide variety of peppers, especially the New Mexican cuisine staple, and one of New Mexico's state vegetables, the New Mexico chile.

History
Hatch was originally settled as Santa Barbara in 1851; however, Apache raids drove the farmers away until 1853, when the nearby Fort Thorn was established. Fort Thorn closed in 1859, and the town was abandoned again in 1860. It was not until 1875 that it was re-occupied and at that time it was renamed "Hatch" for Indian fighter Edward Hatch, who was then commander of the military District of New Mexico .

Geography
Hatch is located at  (32.664919, -107.158668).

Demographics
It is part of the Las Cruces Metropolitan Statistical Area.

As of the census of 2000, there were 1,673 people, 538 households, and 402 families residing in the village. The population density was 540.2 people per square mile (208.4/km). There were 635 housing units at an average density of 205.0 per square mile (79.1/km). The racial makeup of the village was 46.03% White, 0.36% African American, 0.96% Native American, 0.24% Pacific Islander, 50.03% from other races, and 2.39% from two or more races. Hispanic or Latino of any race were 79.20% of the population.

There were 538 households, out of which 43.7% had children under the age of 18 living with them, 56.7% were married couples living together, 14.3% had a female householder with no husband present, and 25.1% were non-families. 20.6% of all households were made up of individuals, and 11.0% had someone living alone who was 65 years of age or older. The average household size was 3.11, and the average family size was 3.63.

In the village, the population was spread out, with 35.7% under the age of 18, 9.7% from 18 to 24, 24.3% from 25 to 44, 17.9% from 45 to 64, and 12.3% who were 65 years of age or older. The median age was 30 years. For every 100 females, there were 94.5 males. For every 100 females age 18 and over, there were 93.9 males.

The median income for a household in the village was $21,250, and the median income for a family was $23,819. Males had a median income of $21,923 versus $17,188 for females. The per capita income for the village was $14,619. About 28.5% of families and 34.5% of the population were below the poverty line, including 50.1% of those under age 18 and 14.6% of those age 65 or over.

Economy
The Hatch Chile Festival is an annual event that occurs each Labor Day. This event attracts people worldwide to a place known as the chile capital of the world. The small town has accommodated up to 30,000 people for this event. This small farming community is known worldwide for raising renowned chiles. By 2012, Hatch chiles were being marketed under their name in most major urban markets in the US. Other crops such as onions, cotton, and corn are also raised there. Irrigation of local farms is accomplished by wells pumping ground water along with surface water irrigation ditches.

In 2012, the NMSA announced it would be building a spaceport visitor's center in Hatch.

Education
Hatch Valley Public Schools is the local school district.

See also
 List of municipalities in New Mexico

References

External links

 
 Hatch Chile Festival 2008, Creative Commons gallery at Flickr

Villages in Doña Ana County, New Mexico
Villages in New Mexico
Populated places established in 1851
Populated places established in 1875
1851 establishments in New Mexico Territory
1875 establishments in New Mexico Territory
New Mexico populated places on the Rio Grande